Evgeny Nikolayevich Belukhin (born August 20, 1983 in Sarov) is a Russian-Ukrainian professional ice hockey forward. He currently plays with HC Donbass in the Ukrainian Hockey League (UHL).

Belukin made his Kontinental Hockey League debut with HC Lada Togliatti during the 2009–10 KHL season.

References

External links
 

1983 births
Living people
HC Donbass players
Kazzinc-Torpedo players
HC Lada Togliatti players
Metallurg Novokuznetsk players
Neftyanik Almetyevsk players
People from Sarov
HC Sarov players
Saryarka Karagandy players
HC Shakhtyor Soligorsk players
Torpedo Nizhny Novgorod players
Ukrainian ice hockey forwards
Universiade medalists in ice hockey
Universiade gold medalists for Russia
Competitors at the 2009 Winter Universiade
Competitors at the 2011 Winter Universiade
Sportspeople from Nizhny Novgorod Oblast